24-7-365 is the second album by rap group, N2Deep.  The album was released in 1994 for Bust It Records and was produced by N2Deep and Johnny Z.  Despite the success of their previous album, Back to the Hotel, 24-7-365 did not make it on any album charts or feature any charting singles.  Four singles were released "Deep N2 the Game", "Small Town", "California Hot Tubs" and "Somethin' Freaky".

Track listing

Samples
Deep N2 the Game
"Miss You" by The Rolling Stones
Whoo Ride
"Rigor Mortis" by Cameo

External links
 24-7-365 at Discogs

References

N2Deep albums
Jay Tee albums
1994 albums